This is the list of 2012 Malaysia Super League goalscorers.

Goals 
15 goals

Jean-Emmanuel Effa Owona (Negeri Sembilan FA)
Francis Doe Forkey (Terengganu FA)

13 goals
Michal Kubala (Perak FA)

12 goals
Boško Balaban (Selangor FA)

10 goals

Shahril Ishak (Singapore LIONSXII)
Ahmad Shakir Mohd Ali (Negeri Sembilan FA)
Mohd Khyril Muhymeen Zambri (Kedah FA)

9 goals

Mohammed Ghaddar (Kelantan FA)
Mohd Faiz Subri (PBDKT T-Team FC)
Zairo Anuar Zalani (PBDKT T-Team FC)

8 goals

Shahdan Sulaiman (Singapore LIONSXII)
Mohd Badri Mohd Radzi (Kelantan FA)

7 goals

Arthuro Henrique Bernhardt (Johor FC)
Indra Putra Mahayuddin (Kelantan FA)
Michaël Niçoise (PKNS FC)
Mohd Fadzli Saari (PBDKT T-Team FC)
Mohd Ashaari Shamsuddin (Terengganu FA)
Albert Ebossé Bodjongo (Perak FA)

6 goals

Mohd Norfarhan Mohamad (Kelantan FA)
Mohd Fauzan Dzulkifli (PKNS FC)
Sharudin Yakup (Sabah FA)
Norshahrul Idlan Talaha (Kelantan FA)
Mohd Amri Yahyah (Selangor FA)
Vedran Gerc (Kedah FA)
Rozaimi Abdul Rahman (Sabah FA)

5 goals

Agu Casmir (Singapore LIONSXII)
Farderin Kadir (Felda United FC)
Mickaël Antoine-Curier (Felda United FC)
Sufian Anuar (Singapore LIONSXII)
Mohd Safiq Rahim (Selangor FA)
Akmal Rizal Ahmad Rakhli (Perak FA)
Hariss Harun (Singapore LIONSXII)
Mohd Helmi Remeli (PKNS FC)

4 goals

Abdul Manaf Mamat (Terengganu FA)
Muhammad Shukor Adan (Negeri Sembilan FA)
Mohd Haris Safwan Mohd Kamal (Johor FC)
Zakaria Charara (Kuala Lumpur FA)
Joseph Kalang Tie (Terengganu FA)
Rudie Ramli (PKNS FC)
Ashri Chuchu (Sarawak FA)
Mohd Riduwan M'aon (Johor FC)
Azidan Sarudin (Selangor FA)
Zainizam Marjan (Sabah FA)
Michael Baird (Sabah FA)
Afiq Azmi (Kuala Lumpur FA)
Mohd Firdaus Azizul (Negeri Sembilan FA)

3 goals

Mohd Nizad Ayub (Felda United FC)
Suppiah Chanturu (Kelantan FA)
Muhd Rafiuddin Rodin (Perak FA)
Ramez Dayoub (Selangor FA)
Mohd Khairul Ismail (Johor FC)
Yong Kuong Yong (Felda United FC)
Mohd Raimi Mohd Nor (Felda United FC)
Vedran Muratović (Sarawak FA)
Ismail Faruqi Asha'ri (Terengganu FA)
Joël Epalle (Sarawak FA)
Safuwan Baharudin (Singapore LIONSXII)
Mohamad Fazli Baharudin (PKNS FC)
Khairul Izwan Khalid (PBDKT T-Team FC)
Shahurain Abu Samah (Negeri Sembilan FA)
Abdul Hadi Yahya (Terengganu FA)
Guy Bwele (Sarawak FA)
Baddrol Bakhtiar (Kedah FA)

2 goals

Fahrul Razi Kamaruddin (Perak FA)
K. Ravindran (Sarawak FA)
Denny Antwi (Kelantan FA)
Shaiful Esah (Singapore LIONSXII)
Azi Shahril Azmi (Johor FC)
Mohd Nizaruddin Yusof (PKNS FC)
Ahmad Fakri Saarani (Felda United FC)
Mohd Rizal Fahmi Abdul Rosid (Kelantan FA)
Mohd Azrif Nasrulhaq Badrul (PKNS FC)
Azrul Hazran Amiludin Baki (PBDKT T-Team FC)
Shahrizal Saad (Johor FC)
Muhammad Shafiq Jamal (Perak FA)
Bobby Gonzales (Sabah FA)
Mohd Fazrul Hazli Mohd Kadri (Perak FA)
Mohd Shahrol Saperi (Sarawak FA)
Mohd Azrul Ahmad (Felda United FC)
Onyekachi Nwoha (Kelantan FA)
Irwan Shah (Singapore LIONSXII)
P. Gunalan (Selangor FA)
Hamidan Mohammed (Kedah FA)
Mohd Syazwan Zainon (Johor FC)
Emmanuel Okine (Kuala Lumpur FA)
Solehin Kanasian Abdullah (Selangor FA)
Fernando de Abreu Ferreira (Johor FC)
Mohd Hairol Mokhtar (Sarawak FA)
Baihakki Khaizan (Singapore LIONSXII)
Khairul Nizam (Singapore LIONSXII)
Mohd Amirul Hadi Zainal (Selangor FA)
Khairul Azahar Eidros (Sarawak FA)
Zamri Morshidi (Sarawak FA)
Azizan Saperi (Sarawak FA)
Mohd Faizal Abu Bakar (Kedah FA)
Mohd Muslim Ahmad (Terengganu FA)
S. Kunanlan (Negeri Sembilan FA)
Mohd Nurul Azwan Roya (Kelantan FA)
Brendan Gan (Sabah FA)
Hendrik Helmke (Sabah FA)

1 goals

Lazar Popović (Perak FA)
Mohd Nazri Mohd Kamal (Perak FA)
Muhamad Kaironnisam Sahabudin Hussain (Johor FC)
S. Subramaniam (Kelantan FA)
Sevki Sha'ban (Singapore LIONSXII)
Rosdi Talib (PBDKT T-Team FC)
Marco Tulio (PBDKT T-Team FC)
Yosri Derma Raju (Sarawak FA)
Muhd Khairu Azrin Khazali (PKNS FC)
Mohd Norhakim Hassan (PKNS FC)
Famirul Asraf Sayuti (Selangor FA)
Ronny Harun (Sabah FA)
Amar Rohidan (Kedah FA)
Muhammad Fiqry Mat Isa (Kedah FA)
Mohd Izuan Jarudin (Johor FC)
Abdul Shukur Jusoh (Terengganu FA)
Nordin Alias (Terengganu FA)
Muhd Shahrom Abdul Kalam (Perak FA)
Mohd Failee Mohamad Ghazli (Perak FA)
Azlan Ismail (Kelantan FA)
Obinna Nwaneri (Kelantan FA)
G. Mahathevan (Negeri Sembilan FA)
Mohd Alif Shamsudin (Negeri Sembilan FA)
Bojan Petrić (PBDKT T-Team FC)
Norfazly Alias (PBDKT T-Team FC)
Kalle Sone (Sarawak FA)
Paulo Sérgio Ferreira Gomes (PKNS FC)
K. Gurusamy (Selangor FA)
Abdulfatah Safi (Kedah FA)
Stanley Bernard Stephen Samuel (Kuala Lumpur FA)
Khairul Anuar Shafie (Kuala Lumpur FA)
Fazuan Abdullah (Kuala Lumpur FA)
Pritam Singh Charun Singh (Kuala Lumpur FA)
Radzi Mohd Hussin (Sabah FA)
Jasazrin Jamaluddin (Johor FC)
Zairul Fitree Ishak (Kelantan FA)
Mohd Daudsu Jamaluddin (Kelantan FA)
Marian Farbák (Negeri Sembilan FA)
Zachariah Simukonda (PBDKT T-Team FC)
Mohd Norhafizzuan Jailani (PKNS FC)
Mohd Azizan Baba (Sarawak FA)
Mohd Firdaus Faudzi (Felda United FC)
Helmi Loussaief (PKNS FC)
R. Surendran (Selangor FA)
Mohd Fitri Shazwan Raduwan (Selangor FA)
Mohd Fadhil Mohd Hashim (PKNS FC)
Erison da Silva Santos (Terengganu FA)
Juffrey Omopor (Sabah FA)
Razid Gafar (Sabah FA)
Leopold Alphonso (Sabah FA)

Own goal
1 goal
Aiman Syazwan Abdullah (Kuala Lumpur FA) (for Singapore LIONSXII)
Mohd Helmi Remeli (PKNS FC) (for Sabah FA)
Khairan Ezuan Razali (Felda United FC) (for Perak FA)
Mohd Sabre Mat Abu (Kedah FA) (for Sabah FA)
Mohd Syazwan Mohd Roslan (Perak FA) (for Kedah FA)
Mohd Fadzli Saari (T-Team FC) (for PKNS FC)
Mafry Balang (Sabah FA) (for Perak FA)
S. Kunanlan (Negeri Sembilan FA) (for Terengganu FA)
Shahrul Azhar Ture (Sabah FA) (for Singapore LIONSXII)
Mohd Fazliata Taib (Kedah FA) (for Kelantan FA)
Ahmad Jihad Ismail (Kuala Lumpur FA) (for Sabah FA)
Mohd Reithaudin Awang Emran (Sabah FA) (for Terengganu FA)
Bojan Petrić (PBDKT T-Team FC) (for Singapore LIONSXII)

References

1. Penjaring Terbanyak MSL

External links
 News website

2012 in Malaysian football
2012 goalscorers

ms:Liga Super Malaysia 2012